Karachi City Station, formerly McLeod Station, is one of two main Karachi railway terminals along with the Karachi Cantonment station. Karachi City Station is located on I. I. Chundrigar Road, adjacent to Habib Bank Plaza, in Karachi, Pakistan. This station is headquarters of the Pakistan Railways - Karachi Division.

History
Karachi City Station was first established along the southern edge of McLeod Road (now I. I. Chundrigar Road) as the southern terminus point of the Scinde Railway, which was established in March 1855. A railway line was to be constructed between Karachi and Kotri and work on the Karachi terminus commenced in April 1858. On 13 May 1861, the line was opened to the public, and was the first railway line for public traffic between Karachi and Kotri, a distance of 108 miles (174 km). The station was completed in May 1864, and was upgraded in the 1880s with construction of a building farther to the west. By 1905, the station was referred to by British authorities as "Karachi City station," in plans to provide a roof at the passenger platform. Station yards were re-arranged and expanded around 1908. The station was upgraded again in 1935, when the current building made of local yellow Gizri sandstone was built.

Facilities 
Karachi City Station is equipped with all basic facilities. The station has current and advance reservation offices for Pakistan Railways as well as cargo and parcel facilities. Retail shops are found on platform 1. Due to the lack of space, most passenger trains have since been moved to Karachi Cantonment Station.

Services
Trains that originate from Karachi City Station are as follows:

Gallery

References 

Railway stations in Karachi
Railway stations opened in 1864
Railway stations on Karachi Circular Railway
Railway stations on Karachi–Peshawar Line (ML 1)